Tereke-yurén-tepui is one of the four main tepuis of the Los Testigos chain in Bolívar, Venezuela. Looking west to east, it is the third major peak of the massif and is connected to Murisipán-tepui and Kamarkawarai-tepui by a common basement (the westernmost peak, Aparamán-tepui, is relatively isolated by comparison). Its summit plateau comprises mostly bare rock.

In his 1978 book, La Vegetación del Mundo Perdido, Charles Brewer-Carías applied the name Tereke Yurén-tepui to what is now generally known as Murisipán-tepui and used Tucuy-wo-cuyén-tepui for the smallest of the four main peaks: what is now known as Tereke-yurén-tepui.

See also
 Distribution of Heliamphora

References

Tepuis of Venezuela
Mountains of Venezuela
Mountains of Bolívar (state)